Oberstrass is a quarter in the district 6 in Zürich.

It was formerly a municipality of its own, having been incorporated into Zürich in 1893.

The Rigiblick funicular can be found in Oberstrass as one of two funiculars within the city of Zürich.

Built in 1901 as Rigiblick restaurant, the former Gastsaal was re-opened as Theater Rigiblick in 1984.

References

External links 

Districts of Zürich
Former municipalities of the canton of Zürich